Denstone railway station is a former station of the North Staffordshire Railway's (NSR) Churnet Valley Line which served the village of Denstone in Staffordshire.

History
The Churnet Valley line was authorised in 1846 and opened to traffic between Macclesfield and Uttoxeter in 1849.  Denstone did not originally have a station but in 1873 a station was opened at the site of the College Road level crossing.  As it had been built at the crossing the station was called Denstone Crossing.  In 1923 one of the last acts of the NSR before it became part of the LMS was to rename the station simply Denstone.

The station closed on 4 January 1965.

Present day
The platforms remain in situ as part of a footpath to Oakamoor via Alton Towers but a house has been built across the route of the line, adjoining the former level crossing.

References

Route

Disused railway stations in Staffordshire
Borough of East Staffordshire
Former North Staffordshire Railway stations
Beeching closures in England
Railway stations in Great Britain opened in 1873
Railway stations in Great Britain closed in 1965